Sonia Kleindorfer is a bird ecology expert with a focus on organismal complexity and the impact animals have on evolutionary dynamics in birds and parasites. In 2016 she received the D. L. Serventy Medal from BirdLife Australia. She heads Grünau’s Core Facility Konrad Lorenz Research Station for Behaviour and Cognition and is Scientific Director of the Flinders Research Centre for Climate Adaptation and Animal Behaviour. Other related roles include: Treasurer of the Royal Society of South Australia (2017-18) after which she was promoted to Vice President. Kleindorfer has a Bachelors in Biological Basis of Behavior from the University of Pennsylvania a PhD in Zoology from the University of Vienna and a postdoc in Medicine from the University of Washington School of Medicine.

References

Living people
Year of birth missing (living people)